Bartholomew Yu Chengti (17 August 1919 – 14 September 2009) was a Chinese clandestine Roman Catholic bishop.

Bishop Yu was born in the Roman Catholic family in 1919. He joined the major theological seminary at the age 17 and was ordained a priest in 1949. He was detained and sent to a forced labour camp in the time of the Cultural Revolution. After the release from camp, he was clandestinely consecrated as bishop of the Roman Catholic Diocese of Hanzhong on December 10, 1981. He served as bishop until 2003. Bishop Yu was never recognised by the Chinese government and never joined the Chinese Patriotic Catholic Association. He was an older brother of another clandestine bishop Matthias Yu Chengxin.

References

1919 births
2009 deaths
Chinese prisoners and detainees
Prisoners and detainees of the People's Republic of China
20th-century Roman Catholic bishops in China